Fitz James O'Brien (also spelled Fitz-James; 25 October 1826 – 6 April 1862) was an Irish-American Civil War soldier, writer, and poet often cited as an early writer of science fiction.

Biography
O'Brien was born Michael O'Brien in Cork, Ireland and was very young when the family moved to Limerick, Ireland. He attended the University of Dublin and is believed to have been a soldier in the British army at one time. On leaving college, he went to London and in the course of four years spent his inheritance of £8,000, meanwhile editing a periodical in aid of the World's Fair of 1851. About 1852 he emigrated to the United States, in the process changing his name to Fitz James, and thenceforth he devoted his attention to literature.

While he was in college he had shown an aptitude for writing verse, and two of his poems—Loch Ine and Irish Castles—were published in The Ballads of Ireland (1856).

His earliest writings in the United States were contributed to the Lantern, which was then edited by John Brougham. Subsequently, he wrote for the Home Journal, the New York Times, and the American Whig Review. His first important literary connection was with Harper's Magazine, and beginning in February 1853, with The Two Skulls, he contributed more than sixty articles in prose and verse to that periodical.  He likewise wrote for the New York Saturday Press, Putnam's Magazine, Vanity Fair, and the Atlantic Monthly. To the latter, he sent "The Diamond Lens" (1858) and "The Wonder Smith" (1859). "The Diamond Lens" is probably his most famous short story, and tells the story of a scientist who invents a powerful microscope and discovers a beautiful female in a microscopic world inside a drop of water. H.P. Lovecraft was an admirer of the work. "The Wonder Smith" is an early predecessor of robot rebellion, where toys possessed by evil spirits are transformed into living automata who turn against their creators. His 1858 short story "From Hand to Mouth" has been referred to as "the single most striking example of surrealistic fiction to pre-date Alice in Wonderland" (Sam Moskowitz, 1971). "What Was It? A Mystery" (1859) is one of the earliest known examples of invisibility in fiction.

He was also employed in writing plays. For James W. Wallack he made A Gentleman from Ireland, which held the boards for a generation. He also wrote and adapted other pieces for the theatres, but they had a shorter existence.

In New York, he at once associated with the brilliant set of contemporary Bohemians, among whom he was ranked as the ablest. At the weekly dinners that were given by John Brougham, or at the nightly suppers at Pfaff's on Broadway, he was the soul of the entertainment.

When the American Civil War began in 1861, O'Brien joined the 7th regiment of the New York National Guard, hoping to be sent to the front. He was stationed at Camp Cameron outside Washington, D.C. for six weeks. When his regiment returned to New York he received an appointment on the staff of General Frederick W. Lander. He was severely wounded in a skirmish on 26 February 1862, and lingered until April, when he died of tetanus at Cumberland, Maryland.

His friend, William Winter, collected The Poems and Stories of Fitz James O'Brien, to which are added personal recollections by old associates that survived him (Boston, 1881).  Mr. Winter also wrote a chapter on O'Brien in his book Brown Heath and Blue Bells (New York, 1895).

Bibliography

Notable Short stories

"The Diamond Lens" (1858)
"From Hand to Mouth" (1858)
"The Wondersmith" (1859)
"What Was It? A Mystery" (1859)
"How I Overcame My Gravity" (1864)
"The Lost Room" (1858) was republished in the premier issue (Fall 1949) of The Magazine of Fantasy.

Collections

The Poems and Stories of Fitz James O'Brien (1881)
Collected Stories ( Collected Stories And Tales on dustjacket ) Edited with an introduction by Edward J. O'Brien ( Albert & Charles Boni, New York 1925)

References

 Initial text from Appleton's Cyclopedia of American Biography (1887–1889)''

External links

 
 
 
Violetbooks Bibliography of O'Brien's supernatural stories
Bibliography of O'Brien's Works
"The Lost Room" at Manybooks
The Vault at Pfaff's; O'Brien, Fitz-James (1828-1862)
"Michael Fitz-James O'Brien (1826-1862)" by Randal A. Everts @ http://thestrangecompany.us/index.php/michael_fitz-james_o_brien/

Irish science fiction writers
Union Army officers
1828 births
1862 deaths
People from County Cork
Irish soldiers in the United States Army
Irish male dramatists and playwrights
Irish male poets
American male dramatists and playwrights
Irish journalists
Irish male short story writers
19th-century Irish short story writers
Irish emigrants to the United States (before 1923)
People of New York (state) in the American Civil War
Deaths from tetanus
Union military personnel killed in the American Civil War
Writers from New York (state)
19th-century Irish dramatists and playwrights
19th-century Irish poets
19th-century American dramatists and playwrights
19th-century American poets
American male poets
19th-century journalists
Male journalists
Irish fantasy writers
19th-century American short story writers
19th-century American male writers
Weird fiction writers